Park County School District #16 is a public school district based in Meeteetse, Wyoming, United States.

Geography
Park County School District #16 serves the southeastern portion of Park County. The town of Meeteetse is the only incorporated place in the district.

Schools
Meeteetse School (Grades K-12)

Student demographics
The following figures are as of October 1, 2009.

Total District Enrollment: 119
Student enrollment by gender
Male: 58 (48.74%)
Female: 61 (51.26%)
Student enrollment by ethnicity
Black or African American: 1 (0.84%)
Hispanic or Latino: 2 (1.68%)
White: 116 (97.48%)

See also
List of school districts in Wyoming

References

External links
Park County School District #16 – official site.

Education in Park County, Wyoming
School districts in Wyoming